Anton Lazarev (born May 29, 1990) is a Russian professional ice hockey forward currently playing with HC Kunlun Red Star in the Kontinental Hockey League (KHL). Lazarev previously signed a two-year contract with Avtomobilist Yekaterinburg after two seasons with Metallurg Novokuznetsk on May 8, 2013.

During the 2020–21 season, Lazarev registered 1 goal in 10 games with Traktor Chelyabinsk before he was released from his contract. On 14 December 2020, Lazarev continued in the KHL, agreeing to a contract for the remainder of the season with HC Kunlun Red Star.

Career statistics

International

References

External links

1990 births
Amur Khabarovsk players
Atlant Moscow Oblast players
Avtomobilist Yekaterinburg players
HC Kunlun Red Star players
Living people
Metallurg Novokuznetsk players
Russian ice hockey right wingers
Salavat Yulaev Ufa players
Traktor Chelyabinsk players
Universiade medalists in ice hockey
HC Vityaz players
Universiade gold medalists for Russia
Competitors at the 2011 Winter Universiade